Keesha Keane (born 17 December 1995 in Koror) is a Palauan swimmer. She competed in the women's 50m freestyle at the 2012 Summer Olympics in London finishing with a time of 28.25 seconds in 50th place in the heats.

References

External links

1995 births
Living people
People from Koror
Palauan female swimmers
Olympic swimmers of Palau
Swimmers at the 2012 Summer Olympics
Palauan female freestyle swimmers